James Peter Kaye (born 18 February 1964 in Harrogate, North Yorkshire) is a British auto racing driver. He has been a stalwart competitor of Hondas in various championships since 1995, and has had 2 lengthy spells in the BTCC. He won the BTCC independents' championship in 1992 and 1994.

Racing career

After racing in the British National Production Saloon Championship with several championship in the late 80s and early 90s, he entered the BTCC as an independent in 1992, winning the independent title in his Toyota, and again in 1994. In 1993 he raced a semi-works Toyota for the Park Lane Racing team, ineligible for the Total Cup for Independents. In 1995 he was hired by Honda for their BTCC programme, racing there for 2 seasons.

He had an assortment of sports car drives for Honda from 1997–1999, returning to touring cars in the National Saloon Championship in 2000. The same cars were eligible for the newly created Class B of the BTCC that year, and James was runner up in a Honda Accord. This was renamed the Production Class for 2001, and James again finished 2nd, before winning the Production Class title in 2002 for Synchro Motorsport, a team of Honda employees working in their spare time at the Honda factory in Swindon.

The team moved up to the Touring class of the BTCC for 2003, defined as an Independent team as they had no financial or technical backing, James classified as Independent runner-up and 14th overall. Remaining with Synchro, James was 11th overall in 2004 and 2005. He took his first series podium at Oulton Park in 2006 after 14 years of trying. For 2007 the team pulled out, leaving James without a drive.

He returned to the BTCC for the 2013 season, driving the AmD Tuning.com Volkswagen Golf in the Jack Sears Trophy. 

For the final round of the 2018 Dunlop Endurance Championship, Kaye raced with Matt Le Breton in an Audi RS3 TCR, finishing 11th in race one and 4th in race two.

Career highlights
2006 BTCC with Synchro Racing, once again back in the Civic Type R. Scored in four of the first six races, and then at Oulton Park qualified a fine fourth and converted it into his first BTCC podium finish.
2005 BTCC with Synchro Racing, Honda Civic Type R. Quietly began racking up points finishes but constantly in the wars. His best finish was at the Indy round at Brands Hatch, where he was 4th in race three. He even resorted to changing his race number (from 10 to 31) in the final round to see if it would bring a change of luck. Perhaps it worked: he finished all three races in the points, making a season total of 58, 11th in the championship.
2004 BTCC with Synchro with the Civic again. A quiet year by James' high standards, but 3rd in qualifying and 4th in the first race at Brands Hatch was a high point. Ended up 11th in the championship with 49 points, 5th in the Independents.
2003 BTCC with Team Synchro, Honda Civic Type R. His season seemed to lack consistency but still led to 2nd in the Independents' cup.
2002 BTCC Production Class – Honda – Champion; Macau Grand Prix – 6th in second heat
2001 BTCC Production Class – Honda – 2nd; Spa 24 Hours; Macau Grand Prix – 4th
2000 BTCC Production Class – Honda – 2nd
1999 Belgian Procar Championship
1997 FIA World GT Championship
1996 BTCC – Honda – 12th
1995 BTCC – Honda – 18th
1994 BTCC Independents' Cup – Toyota – Champion; Australian Touring Cars
1993 BTCC – Toyota Junior Team – 20th; Japanese Group A Touring Cars
1992 BTCC Independents' Cup – Toyota – Champion
1991 British National Group N Championship – Honda Civic Vtec
1990 Honda CRX Championship
1989 Ford Fiesta Championship – Champion; Renault 5 Turbo Championship; Honda CRX Championship; Uniroyal Production Saloon Car Championship
1988 Uniroyal Production Saloon Car Championship – Class Champion; Renault 5 Turbo Championship; Honda CRX Championship
1987 Renault 5 Turbo Championship – 2nd
1986 Uniroyal Production Saloon Car Championship – Class Champion
1985 Uniroyal Production Saloon Car Championship – Champion
1984 Uniroyal Production Saloon Car Championship – Class Champion
1983 Uniroyal Production Saloon Car Championship

Personal life
James' Father Peter Kaye was a Hillclimb/Sprint driver, which was a great influence on James growing up. James is the oldest of 5 children, and his younger brother Richard Kaye, has also raced professionally. James is married and has 5 children.

Racing record

Complete British Saloon / Touring Car Championship results
(key) Races in bold indicate pole position (1 point awarded – 1996–2002 all races, 2003–present just in first race, 1987–1989 and 2000–2003 in class) Races in italics indicate fastest lap (1 point awarded – 1987–1989 and 2000–present all races, 1987–1989 and 2000–2003 in class) * signifies that driver lead race for at least one lap (1 point awarded – 2001 just in feature races, 2003–present all races, 2001 for leading in class)

‡ Kaye won in class but was awarded no points due to less than 3 class cars starting the race.

Complete Japanese Touring Car Championship results
(key) (Races in bold indicate pole position) (Races in italics indicate fastest lap)

Complete Bathurst 1000 results

* Super Touring race

Complete 24 Hours of Spa results

Complete 24 Hours of Silverstone results

Complete Britcar results
(key) (Races in bold indicate pole position in class – 1 point awarded just in first race; races in italics indicate fastest lap in class – 1 point awarded all races;-

References

External links
Official KayeSport Website
BTCC Driver Entry
Barwell Motorsport

1964 births
Living people
English racing drivers
British Touring Car Championship drivers
Britcar 24-hour drivers
World Touring Car Championship drivers
Porsche Carrera Cup GB drivers
Britcar drivers
24 Hours of Spa drivers
24H Series drivers